Veselin Shulev (born 12 August 1972) is a former Bulgarian footballer who played as a goalkeeper.

Career

Shulev spent his entire career in Bulgaria (aside from appearing in friendly matches for Macedonian club Bregalnitsa Stip), chiefly playing in the top division of Bulgarian football, becoming vice-champion of Bulgaria in 1997 with Neftochimic. He also earned one cap for the senior national team.

References

1972 births
Living people
People from Dupnitsa
Bulgarian footballers
Association football goalkeepers
Neftochimic Burgas players
PFC Spartak Pleven players
PFC Marek Dupnitsa players
PFC Levski Sofia players
First Professional Football League (Bulgaria) players
Bulgaria international footballers
Sportspeople from Kyustendil Province